THR or Thr may refer to:

Entertainment
 The Hollywood Reporter, an American digital and print magazine
 Yamaha THR, a series of guitar amps
 THR.fm, a defunct radio channel in Malaysia

Biochemistry, biology, and medicine
 Target heart rate, a desired range of heart rate reached during aerobic exercise
 total hip replacement
 Tobacco harm reduction
 Threonine (Thr), an amino acid that is used in the biosynthesis of proteins
 Thrombin (Thr), a serine protease

Aviation
 Tehran Airline (ICAO airline code: THR), see List of airline codes (T)
 Mehrabad International Airport (IATA airport code: THR), an international airport serving Tehran, the capital city of Iran
 thrust (THR), see List of aviation, aerospace and aeronautical abbreviations
 threshold (THR), see List of aviation, aerospace and aeronautical abbreviations

Other uses
 THR (soldering), through-hole reflow soldering
 Tharu languages (ISO 639 language code: thr)
 HTC–Highroad (OCI team code: THR), a former professional cycling team competing in international road bicycle races

See also

 
 Thrr (disambiguation)